PowerEsim is an electronic circuit simulation software for online switched-mode power supply (SMPS)  and transformer design. It can carry out loss analysis at component and circuit level, simulation of board temperature, design verification, failure rate analysis and generate relevant reports.

One of the common circuit design simulation tool used is a SPICE simulator. This knowledge-oriented design approach tool requires a user to possess knowledge about it and about the module being simulated. Within a different kind of simulation, transformer design and simulation requires much knowledge of the physical concepts, although a transformer is just wires around a magnetic core.

To evaluate the feasibility of a user simulating a circuit without domain knowledge, PowerEsim was developed as a result-oriented approach simulation tool only requiring the BOM (Bill of Materials) and the topology used to perform the simulation.

PowerEsim also handles differential equations by using closed-form equations instead of numerical methods. Some approximations have been made to speed up calculation, leading to a steady-state simulation in PowerEsim claimed to take less than 0.1 second, 1,000 times faster than SPICE simulation. PowerEsim model components are available in the market.

References

Notes

 杨文广, 杨玉岗, 李洪珠, 高奇 (2009). "基于PowerEsim的开关电源的高频变压器设计 Design of high-frequency transformer for switching power supply based on PowerEsim". 仪器仪表用户 16(2), 70–71.
 Poon, N. K. & Liu, C. P. Investigation on Designing Procedure of Power Supply, IEEE Power Electronics and Motion Control Conference, 2009. IPEMC '09.
 Yick Po Chan Man Hay Pong Leakage Inductance Calculation of Complex Transformer Constructions based on a Simple Two-Coil Inductor Model Power Electronics Specialists Conference, 2006. PESC '06. 37th IEEE

External links
 PowerEsim
 BCD provide full feature PowerEsim for trial
 Rubadue provide full feature magnetic builder for trial

Computer-aided engineering software
Electronic circuit simulators
Electronic design automation software